Calgary Foothills Football Club (CFFC) is a Canadian soccer club based in Calgary, Alberta, that competes in USL League Two (USL2). The club was founded as a youth club in 1972 and joined as a USL2 franchise in 2015. The team plays its home games at the Foothills Composite High School in Okotoks. The team colours are green and white.

History 
Calgary had previously hosted the Calgary Storm of USL2 (then known as Premier Development League) during the 2001 season. Calgary Foothills FC launched in 2014 as they played a series of exhibition games against Vancouver Whitecaps U 23's, FC Edmonton Reserves, and local university clubs.

The club's inaugural game was played on May 17, 2015 against Puget Sound Gunners FC, winning 2–1. The club finished 4th in the Northwest Division in 2015 with a 3–2–7 record, ultimately missing the playoffs.

In the 2016 season, Calgary Foothills won the Northwest Division with an 8–3–3 record, despite only 4% of supporters predicting the club would win the division. In the playoffs, Calgary Foothills would defeat Seattle Sounders U-23, FC Golden State Force, and FC Tucson to win the Western Conference. Calgary Foothills would later defeat Ocean City Nor'easters in the semifinals to advance to the 2016 final against Michigan Bucks. Calgary would lose the final 3–2 on a controversial penalty decision in the 86th minute.

In the 2017 season, despite losing key players Elijah Adekugbe and Dominic Russo to injury, Calgary Foothills would improve on their point total from the season before, finishing second in the Northwest Division on goal differential to Portland Timbers U-23. The club would lose to Portland in the Northwest Division play-in game. Off the pitch, the club would open an $11 million indoor training facility, the first of its kind in Western Canada.

After playing in three stadiums in three years, and struggling to find a venue that met league standards in Calgary, the club would move 20 km south to the town of Okotoks for the 2018 season to play at Foothills Composite High School stadium. Prior to the start of the season, the club made headlines when Canadian national women's team goalkeeper Stephanie Labbé would try out for the USL2 squad. The club would have their best season to date during 2018, only losing once in 14 games, and would become Western Conference champions after defeating Colorado Rapids U-23 and FC Tucson. Foothills would advance to the league final for the second time in three seasons after defeating Chicago FC United, and would win the 2018 Championship 4–2 after extra time, over Reading United AC.

The Foothills played in Saskatoon for the first ever SK Summer Soccer Series which is hosted by the Saskatchewan Selects. The Foothills defeated the Selects 2–1 in front of 3,067 people.

In April 2020, Calgary Foothills announced their withdrawal from the 2020 USL League Two season due to the COVID-19 pandemic. That same month, the league announced the 2020 season would be cancelled.

Youth system 
The Foothills have a full youth academy system from ages U4-U18 for boys and girls. Teams play in the Calgary Minor Soccer Association (CMSA) Tiers 1–6. The Generation program consists of the top players in U15 and U17 boys and girls. These teams are prepared to qualify and compete for the Canada Soccer Toyota National Championship.

Supporters' groups
The Foot Soldiers were founded in February 2015 with the intention of bringing a passionate atmosphere to Calgary Foothills FC games.

Coaching staff 

  Jay Wheeldon – Head Coach
  Mauro Eustaquio – Assistant Coach
  Thomas Cowlishaw – Goalkeeping Coach
  Shari MacDonald – Athletic Therapist

Notable former players

USL2 Squad 

Canadian women's national team goalkeeper Stephanie Labbé had a tryout with the team in preparation for the 2018 season, posting a shutout against the Lethbridge Pronghorns men's soccer team.

Foothills Academy 

 Source: Calgary Foothills FC

Club records

Most appearances
League and playoffs

Bolded players are currently on the Calgary Foothills roster.

Top goalscorers
League and playoffs

Bolded players are currently on the Calgary Foothills roster.

Record

Year-by-year

As of July 20, 2021

Honours
USL League Two
National Champions: 2018
 Western Conference Champions: 2016, 2018
 Northwest Division Champions: 2016, 2018

Player honours

References

Articles with hCards
USL League Two teams
Soccer clubs in Calgary
Association football clubs established in 1972
1972 establishments in Canada
Expatriated football clubs